is a railway station located in Yahatanishi-ku, Kitakyūshū.

Lines 

Chikuhō Electric Railroad
Chikuhō Electric Railroad Line

Platforms

Adjacent stations

Surrounding area
 Japan National Route 200
 Fukuoka Prefectural Route 73
 Fukuoka Prefectural Route 280
 Koyanose Elementary School
 SunLive Koyanose
 Koyanose Post Office
 7-Eleven

Railway stations in Fukuoka Prefecture
Railway stations in Japan opened in 1958